Gotfrid (or Gottfried) Köchert (22 March 1918 – 6 November 1986) was an Austrian who went on to become a yacht racer after World War II, and competed in the 1960 Summer Olympics.

He was the biological father of Austrian-American actress Bibi Besch.

References

1918 births
1986 deaths
Austrian military personnel of World War II
Austrian male sailors (sport)
Olympic sailors of Austria
Sailors at the 1960 Summer Olympics – 5.5 Metre
Sportspeople from Vienna